Constantin Pană (born 17 February 1960 in Lipia Gruiu) is a retired Romanian footballer who played as a central defender and midfielder for clubs in Romania and Greece.

International career
Pană made one appearance for Romania, when he came as a substitute and replaced Gheorghe Hagi in the 67th minute of a friendly which ended 2–2 against Poland in 1983.

References

External links

1960 births
Living people
Romanian footballers
Romania international footballers
Association football defenders
Liga I players
Liga II players
Super League Greece players
FC Sportul Studențesc București players
FC Argeș Pitești players
FC Brașov (1936) players
FC Dinamo București players
Panachaiki F.C. players
Romanian expatriate footballers
Expatriate footballers in Greece
Romanian expatriate sportspeople in Greece
Romanian football managers
FC UTA Arad managers